The four-dotted alpine (Erebia youngi) is a member of the subfamily Satyrinae of the family Nymphalidae. It is found in the north of North America from Alaska, western Yukon, and east in the Northwest Territories as far as Fort McPherson and Tuktoyuktuk.

The wingspan is 35–44 mm. Adults are on the wing from mid-June to late July.

Subspecies
E. y. youngi (Yukon, Alaska)
E. y. herscheli Leussler, 1935 (Yukon)
E. y. rileyi dos Passos, 1947 (Alaska)

Similar species
Reddish alpine (E. lafontainei)
Scree alpine (E. anyuica)

References

Four-dotted alpine
Butterflies of North America